Balázs Pándi (born 6 August 1983) is a Hungarian drummer and journalist. He has worked and toured with various acts from all around the world including Venetian Snares, Otto von Schirach, To Live and Shave in L.A., The Kilimanjaro Darkjazz Ensemble and Zu. He also played drums for the Blood of Heroes project.

Since 2009 he has frequently played drums live with Merzbow, and they have released three live records together. They headlined the experimental stage at the Scion Rock Fest in Tampa, Florida in 2012. More recently, he and Merzbow have performed as a trio with Mats Gustafsson. They released Cuts in 2013 on RareNoise. For the follow-up Cuts of Guilt, Cuts Deeper (2015), they were joined by Thurston Moore of Sonic Youth.

Balázs started an electronica-metal-breakcore project with Bong-Ra called Wormskull in 2010 (their first album "Sound of Hell" was released in 2011). Most recently he joined the Italian experimental instrumental band Zu. His current projects include Italian doom band Obake, Metallic Taste of Blood (featuring Colin Edwin of Porcupine Tree, Eraldo Bernocchi of Obake and Jamie Saft), and Slobber Pup (Saft, Joe Morris and Trevor Dunn). From 2012 he started to play solo shows on selected festivals under his own name.

From 2013, he worked as a journalist at Hungarian news site Index. After the resignation of the majority of the staff in July 2020, he moved to Telex.

Discography
With Marshall Allen, Danny Ray Thompson, Jamie Saft, Trevor Dunn and Roswell Rudd
2019 – Ceremonial Healing (RareNoise)

With Marco Eneidi
2012 – A Hint Traumatized (Karl Schmidt Verlag)

With KK Null
2017 – Demon Core (Ohm Resistance)
2019 – Demoncore 1 (Brain Ticket Death)

With Jason Köhnen
2017 – Darkness Comes in Two's (Svart Lava)

With Merzbow
2010 – Live at Fluc Wanne, Vienna, 2010/05/18 (Dry Lungs)
2011 – Ducks: Live in NYC (Ohm Resistance)
2012 – Katowice (Instant Classic)
2016 – Live at FAC251 (Cold Spring)

With Merzbow and Keiji Haino
2016 – An Untroublesome Defencelessness (RareNoise)
2019 – Become the Discovered, Not the Discoverer (RareNoise)

With Merzbow and Mats Gustafsson
2013 – Cuts (RareNoise)
2015 – Live in Tabačka 13/04/12 (Tabačka)

With Merzbow, Mats Gustafsson, and Thurston Moore
2015 – Cuts of Guilt, Cuts Deeper (RareNoise)

With Metallic Taste of Blood
2012 – Metallic Taste of Blood (RareNoise)

With Obake
2011 – Obake (RareNoise)
2014 – Mutations (RareNoise)

With Ivo Perelman and Joe Morris
2013 – One (RareNoise)

With Lee Ranaldo, Jim Jarmusch, Marc Urselli
2019 – Lee Ranaldo / Jim Jarmusch / Marc Urselli / Balazs Pandi (Trost)
2021 – Churning of the Ocean (Trost)

With Slobber Pup
2013 – Black Aces (RareNoise)
2015 – Pole Axe (RareNoise)

With Wadada Leo Smith, Jamie Saft, and Joe Morris
2014 – Red Hill (RareNoise)

With Rope Cosmetology
2009 – Diffusion de la rue de la Double Identité (Karl Schmidt Verlag)
2009 – Spezial: Gedankengefüge (Compound Thought) (Karl Schmidt Verlag)
2009 – Discoteca Festival (Karl Schmidt Verlag)
2011 — The Honey Fox in Hare's Longing (Karl Schmidt Verlag)
2012 — Disunion Strips (Karl Schmidt Verlag)

With Roswell Rudd, Jamie Saft, and Trevor Dunn
2016 – Strength & Power (RareNoise)

With Mikołaj Trzaska and Rafal Mazur
2014 – Tar & Feathers (Gusstaff)

With Jon Wesseltoft
2018 – Infinite Vice (The Tapeworm)
2019 – Terreng (Moving Furniture)

With Wormskull
2011 – Sound of Hell (Ad Noiseam)

Other appearances

References

External links
 Balázs Pándi at Facebook
 
 
 Merzbow Gustafsson Pandi at RareNoise
 Interview at ThisIsNotAScene
 Interview at The Horrible And The Miserable
 Interview at 

Hungarian musicians
Living people
Hungarian drummers
1983 births
RareNoiseRecords artists
21st-century drummers